Eugene Mabbett Travis (June 10, 1863 in Brooklyn, Kings County, New York – July 25, 1940 in Brooklyn, New York City) was an American businessman and politician from New York. He was New York State Comptroller from 1915 to 1920.

Life
In 1884, he married Fannie Bell Peck (b. 1863).

He was a Republican member of the New York State Senate (6th D.) from 1907 to 1912, sitting in the 130th, 131st, 132nd, 133rd, 134th and 135th New York State Legislatures. He was New York State Comptroller from 1915 to 1920, elected in 1914, 1916 and 1918.

In 1921, Travis, his successor James A. Wendell and bond broker Albert L. Judson were indicted on charges of grand larceny. It was charged that Travis as Comptroller and Wendell as Deputy Comptroller had bought from Judson bonds at prices above the market for the State Sinkung Fund, and so caused the loss of $230,000 for the State. The charges were later dismissed because of lack of evidence to show criminal intent.

He died at his home at 436 Grand Avenue, Brooklyn.

Sources
 Cut off the primary ticket, in NYT on August 21, 1918
 Back on the primary ticket, in NYT on August 24, 1918
 The indictments, in NYT on December 30, 1920
 The impending prosecution, in NYT on April 7, 1921
 The trial continues, questions of jurisdiction, in NYT on June 28, 1921
 Charges dismissed, in NYT on October 7, 1921
 Obit in NYT on July 27, 1940 (subscription required)

1863 births
1940 deaths
Burials at Green-Wood Cemetery
New York State Comptrollers
Politicians from Brooklyn
Republican Party New York (state) state senators